Prof. em. Dr. Armin Gruen (born 27 April 1944 in Bad Berneck, Germany) is, since 1984, professor and head of the Chair of photogrammetry at the Institute of Geodesy and Photogrammetry (IGP), Federal Institute of Technology (ETH) Zurich, Switzerland. Since 1 August 2009, he is retired and is now with the Chair of Information Architecture, ETH Zurich Faculty of Architecture. He is currently acting as a principal investigator on the Simulation Platform of the SEC-FCL (Singapore ETH Centre - Future Cities Laboratory) in Singapore.

Academic career 

Gruen graduated 1968 as Dipl.-Ing. in Geodetic Science and obtained his doctorate degree 1974 in Photogrammetry, both from the Technical University Munich, Germany. From 1969 to 1975 he worked as Research and Teaching Associate, and until 1981 as Chief Engineer at the Institute of Photogrammetry and Cartography, Technical University Munich. From 1981 to 1984 he acted as Associate Professor at the Department of Geodetic Science and Surveying, Ohio State University, Columbus, Ohio, USA.

Gruen has held lecturing and research assignments at the Bundeswehr University Munich, Germany, Helsinki University of Technology, Finland, Università degli Studi di Firenze, Italy, Stanford Research Institute, Menlo Park, USA, Department of Geodesy at the Delft University of Technology, Netherlands, Asian Institute of Technology (AIT), Bangkok, Thailand, Department of Geomatics, University of Melbourne, Australia, Center for Space and Remote Sensing Research, National Central University, Jhongli City, Taiwan, SCUDO program of the Politecnico di Torino and compact courses at the Politecnico di Milano – Polo Regionale di Como, both Italy, Department of Geomatics, National Cheng Kung University, Tainan, Taiwan, CASM (Chinese Academy of Surveying and Mapping), Beijing, China and Shanghai Tongji University, China.

He has lectured at university level since 1969, with photogrammetry and remote sensing as major subjects, and surveying, cartography and adjustment calculus as minor subjects.

Gruen served as the head of the Department of Geodetic Sciences 1996–97 and as the dean of faculty "Rural Engineering and Surveying" of ETH Zurich (1996–98). He was promoted director of the continuing education course "Spatial Information Systems" at ETH Zurich. Through the Commission for Remote Sensing he was member of the Swiss Academy of Natural Sciences. He is member of the editorial boards of several scientific journals. He has published more than 500 articles and papers and is editor and co-editor of over 21 books and conference proceedings. He has organized and co-organized/co-chaired over 35 international conferences and has served as a consultant to various government agencies, system manufacturers, and engineering firms in Germany, Japan, Korea, Switzerland, US, and other countries. He is co-founder of CyberCity AG, Zurich, and 4DiXplorer AG, Zurich, Switzerland.

He served as the president of International Society of Photogrammetry and Remote Sensing (ISPRS) Commission V, as ISPRS council member (second vice president) and council member of the International Union of Surveys and Mapping (IUSM) and as chairman of the ISPRS Financial Commission. He was chairman of the ISPRS International Scientific Advisory Committee (ISAC) and the ISPRS Ad-hoc Committee on "Knowledge Transfer", international member of the Fourth Academic Committee of the State Key Laboratory of Information Engineering in Surveying, Mapping and Remote Sensing (LIESMARS), Wuhan University, China, member of the First Academic Committee of the Key Laboratory of Mapping from Space of the Chinese Academy of Surveying and Mapping (CASM), Beijing, China and member of the executive board of the Digital Earth Society, member of the International Expert Committee for Strategic Development of Center for Earth Observation and Digital Earth (CEODE), Chinese Academy of Sciences, Beijing.

He was member of the Calibration/Validation team and principal investigator for the PRISM sensor on JAXA's ALOS satellite and ordinary member of the German Archaeological Institute (DAI).

Awards and honors 

Gruen's major international awards include the Otto von Gruber Gold Medal (ISPRS, 1980), Talbert Abrams Award Grand Trophy (ASPRS, 1985 and 1996), with Honorable Mention 1989, Fairchild Award (ASPRS, 1995), Miegunyah Distinguished Fellowship Award of the University of Melbourne (1999), ISPRS U.V. Helava Award (2000), E.H. Thompson Award (2005), ISPRS Brock Gold Medal Award (2008), Dr. Boon Indrabarya Gold Medal Award (2009), Yuri Gagarin Medal (Roskosmos, 2014).

He is corresponding member of the German Geodetic Commission (Bavarian Academy of Sciences and Humanities, Munich), Ordinary Member of the German Archaeological Institute (DAI), holds honorary professorships of the Wuhan University, Wuhan, China and Yunnan Normal University, Kunming, China, is honorary member of the Japan Society of Photogrammetry and Remote Sensing (JSPRS) and International Society of Photogrammetry and Remote Sensing (ISPRS).

Gruen is furthermore fellow professor at the Center for Space and Remote Sensing Research, National Central University, Jhongli City, Taiwan, visiting chair professor at the Department of Geomatics, National Cheng Kung University, Tainan, Taiwan.

See also the ETH Zurich Chair of Photogrammetry and Remote Sensing Staff Awards.

Research 

Gruen's group's major scientific achievements include (in chronological order):
 Studies to the processing of amateur photographs (including his PhD thesis "Reconstruction of rotation surfaces from single images")
 System calibration by self-calibration with additional parameters
 Reliability studies and blunder detection in bundle systems
 Algorithms for sequential estimation in bundle systems (on-line triangulation)
 Geometrically constrained multi-image least squares image matching
 CCD-camera based measurement systems in close-range photogrammetry ("videogrammetry")
 Development of the new concept of a Digital Photogrammetric Station with the first pilot system (DIPS1)
 Digital ortho-image generation on general low-cost computers
 PTV system for the measurement of flow structures
 First practical test for the integration of GPS and (simulated) INS observations into a photogrammetric bundle block, including self-calibration
 LSB-Snakes for line feature extraction
 CyberCity Modeler for semi-automated 3D city modeling
 3D modeling and tracking of clouds from satellite and terrestrial imaging sensors
 3D modeling in Archaeology and Cultural/Natural Heritage (among those are the Nasca geoglyphs, Mount Everest, Ayers Rock, the reconstruction of the Great Buddha of Bamyian, etc.)
 Implementation and testing of new sensor and trajectory models for aerial and satellite Linear Array cameras, including self-calibration, for calibration, geo-referencing, validation
 Advanced image matching for DSM generation
 3D Least Squares Surface and Intensity matching
 UAV photogrammetry

His group's most recent major projects in 3D modeling of Cultural Heritage, based on photogrammetry, laser scanning and structured light, include:
Nasca Lines/Geoglyphs, Adobe pyramids of Tucume, Machu Picchu, Pinchango Alto, petroglyphs of Chichictara (all Peru), Mount Everest, Ayers Rock (Australia), reconstruction of the two Great Buddhas of Bamiyan, pre-Columbian site of Xochicalco (Mexico), Maya site of Copan (Honduras), Bayon/Angkor Wat (Cambodia), Drapham Dzong (Bhutan), Weary Herakles (Antalya, Turkey), Khmer Head (Rietberg Museum), Zurich 1800 city model relief, Alfred Escher memorial, St. Gallen Globe (all Zurich), Pfyffer Relief (Lucerne). See also all past and present projects at the Institute of Geodesy and Photogrammetry (IGP), ETH Zurich.

Gruen's main recent research interests include: automated object reconstruction with digital photogrammetric techniques, building and line feature extraction, 3D city modeling, image matching for DTM generation and object extraction, Three-Line Linear Array sensor modeling, industrial quality control using vision techniques, motion capture, body and face reconstruction for animation, imaging techniques for generation and control of VRs/VEs, especially for cultural heritage recording and modeling, 3D processing of very high resolution satellite images, photogrammetric UAV research.

As principal investigator on the Simulation Platform of the SEC-FCL (Future Cities Laboratory) project, he is mainly involved in Smart City applications of 3D/4D city models, including the generation and updating of those models from high-resolution satellite and UAV images.

Beside this he is currently working on cultural and natural heritage projects in Moscow and on Moorea Island.

Publications 

A full list of publications can be found here.

See also ETH Zurich e-collection and NEBIS literature search.

In media

NASCA Project (movies, TV reports) 
 "Nasca – geheimnisvolle Zeichen in Peru" by Roland Blaser, Schweizer Fernsehen MTW, 1999
 "Nasca Lines - The Buried Secrets" by Philip J Day, National Geographic Channel / Edge West Productions, 2010
 "Im Bann der Nasca-Linien", ZDF / ARTE, 2009
 ORF2, 27. May 2004

NASCA Project (written reports) 
 "Der Walfisch in der Wüste" by Ernst Scagnet, Neue Zürcher Zeitung (NZZ), 7./8. Nov 1998
 "Zwischen Rätsel und Geheimnis" by Georg Gerster, NZZ, 28. May 1999
 "Rätselhafte Zeichen im alten Peru", by Silvia Huber, Tages-Anzeiger, 22. Jun 1999
 "Nazca: Geheimnisvolle Zeichen aus der Vergangenheit", Schweizer Fernsehen, 9. Sep 1999
 "Sand rinnt wie Zeit durch die Finger" by Ernst Scagnet, Basler Magazin, 11. Sep 1999
 "Mit dem Computer in die Wüste Perus" by acl, NZZ and NZZ Online, 16. Sep 1999
 "Wasserzeichen in der Wüste" by Joachim Laukenmann, Sonntagszeitung, 24. Oct 1999
 "Ein riesiger Wal in der Wüste" by rk, Tages-Anzeiger, 28. Oct 1999
 "Nasca en 3D", SCIENCES et AVENIR, May 2000, p. 26
 "Sentieri Segreti" by Laura Taccani, la Repubblica delle Donna, 28 Nov 2000
 "Hi-tech solution to age-old mystery", Geographical, Dec 2000, p. 94
 "Spurensuche im Wüstensand", Archäologie in Deutschland, 1/2001, p. 14-19
 "Archäologisches Puzzle statt Spekulationen" by Martin Arnold, Tages-Anzeiger, 3. Jan 2002
 "Dem Rätsel der Geoglyphen auf der Spur" by Martin Leuch, NZZ, 23. Jan 2002
 "Sisyphusarbeit oder Kunst für Götter", uni/eth/Zürich, Nr. 285, Apr 2002, p. 56-58
 "Der rätselhaften Landschaftskunst auf der Spur" by Martin Leuch, Basler Zeitung, 3. May 2002
 "Die Sehnsucht nach dem Unbekannten" by Barbara Vonarburg, Tages-Anzeiger, 22. May 2003
 "Landschafts- und Siedlungsgeschichte im Gebiet der Nasca-Kultur/Peru", Geographische Rundschau, 3/2004, p. 22-29
 "Archäologie ferngesteuert", Abenteuer Archäologie, 4/2005, p. 14-19
 "Das Rätsel der Pampa", National Geographic Deutschland, Aug 2005, S. 20-30
 "Ein Modellhelikopter über versunkenen Stätten", Antike Welt, 1/2006, 37. Jahrgang, p. 85-90
 "XXL-Bilder im Sand", P.M. Perspektive, 1/2007, p. 86-89
 "Das Geheimnis von Nasca ist enthüllt", Bild der Wissenschaft, 1/2007, p. 56-63
 "Kultstätte im Wüstenstaub" by Michael Zick, Süddeutsche Zeitung, 18./19. Apr 2009
 "Nasca ist jetzt etwas weniger geheimnisvoll" by Daniel Bächtold, Tages-Anzeiger, 16. May 2009
 "Das Rätsel von Nazca", P.M. History, 1/2012, p. 34-43

BAMIYAN Project (movies, TV reports, radio) 
 "The Giant Buddhas" by Christian Frei, Documentary, Switzerland 2005
 SRF1, 10vor10, 24. May 2002
 Deutsche Welle (DW), English version
 Deutsche Welle (DW), German version
 SRF1, 10vor10, 5. Sep 2003
 SRF1, 10vor10, 19. Sep 2003
 ARD, W wie Wissen, 24. Sep 2003
 3SAT, Nano, 24. Sep 2003
 3SAT, Nano, 25. Sep 2003
 3SAT, Nano, 26. Sep 2003
 U1 News, 4. Dec 2003
 RTS, le 19:30 Journal, French version
 Plans to remake Giant Buddhas opposed by UNESCO, Radio Free Europe/Radio Liberty, 13. Nov 2003
 Oe1, 7. Jul 2005, 19.05, radio report

BAMIYAN Project (journals, newspapers) 
 "Erstes 3-D-Modell der Buddhas von Bamiyan", Der Standard, 23./24. Mar 2002
 "Riconstruiamo I Buddha la sfida degli archeologi", la Repubblica, 26. Mar 2002
 "Auferstehung der Buddhas", ETHLife, 13. May 2002
 "Wiedergeburt der Giganten", Sonntagsblick, 25. May 2002
 "Wiedergeburt der Buddhas", Computerworld, 31. May 2002
 "Buddhas Rückkehr", Focus 6/2002, p. 118-119
 "Vermessungstechnik: Ein Buddha wird wiedergeboren", GEO, Jan 2003
 "Wiedergeburt der Buddhas", TELE Nr. 42, 2003, magazin Science, p. 115
 "Die Bamian-Buddhas als Punktwolke", DIE ZEIT, 24. Apr 2003
 Donga Daily (Seoul), 11. Jul 2003
 "Des Zurichois ressuscitent les buddhas afghans", Tribune de Genève, 11.-12. Sep 2004
 "Die Auferstehung der Buddhas", NZZ am Sonntag, 10. Oct 2004
 "Renaissance des buddhas afghans à l’heure Suisse", Swissinfo, 3. Nov 2003
 "Scientists seek to replace razed statue", Detroit Free Press, 13. Nov 2003
 GEO (Korea), 3/2003, p. 36-38
 "Zürcher Computer rekonstruieren zerstörte Buddhas von Afghanistan", Tages-Anzeiger, 13. Nov 2003
 "Tall order for Afghan Buddhas. Researchers hope to rebuild statues razed by the Taliban", Chicago Tribune, 13. Nov 2003
 "Model of Taliban-destroyed Buddha created", The Boston Globe, 13. Nov 2003
 "Buddhas reincarnation faces delay", Das NZZ Archiv auf CD-ROM, English Window, 13. Nov 2003
 Nihon Keizai Shimbun, 14. Nov 2003
 "Rebirth of the Afghan Buddhas", Wired News, 14. Nov 2003
 "The Buddhas of Bamiyan", by Avrom Wolf, The Alia Times, 14. Nov 2003
 Asahi Shimbun, 18. Nov 2003
 "Die Buddhas von Bamiyan", Abenteuer Archäologie, 2/2004. p. 70-74
 "Preserving an Afghan Landmark", Geotimes, Jun 2004, p. 24-25
 "Bring back the Buddha", by Matthew Power, Discover, November 2004, p. 70-72
 "Bamian – Rekonstruktion und Aufbau", NZZ, 13. Dec 2004
 "Buddhas virtuelle Auferstehung", Basellandschaftliche Zeitung, 13. Dec 2004
 "Ein Buddha aus Olten", NZZ, 24. Dec 2004
 "Auferstehung der Statuen", St. Galler Tagblatt, 25. Aug 2005
 "Afghan Buddhas may rise again", Guardian Unlimited, 13. Dec 2006

Others 
 "Mount Everest. Surveying the Third Pole", National Geographic, Vol. 174, No. 5, Nov 1988
 "Von der Landvermessung zur Robotik", Technische Rundschau (TR), Heft 26, 84. Jahrgang, 26. Jun 1992, p. 60-66
 "Photogrammetrie – know-how für Fernerkundung und Robotik", Technische Rundschau (TR), Heft 22, 85. Jahrgang, 4. Jun 1993, p. 40-45
 "3-D tracking simplifies volume-image analysis", Opto & Laser Europe, Issue 17, Feb 1995, p. 23-24
 "Unterwegs in virtuellen Stadtlandschaften", Bund, Kanton, Gemeinde, 2/1998, p. 4-5
 "Stadtvermessung dreidimensional", Bund, Kanton, Gemeinde, 4/1998, p. 32-34
 "Mt. Everest – wie Reinhold Messner ihn noch nie sah", Bild der Wissenschaft, 3/2002, p. 54-59
 "Armin Grün, Photogrammeter: In drei Dimensionen zeichnen", Hochparterre, Nr. 8, Aug 2012, 25. Jahrgang

References

Sources 

 "Grün, Armin." In: Kürschners Deutscher Gelehrten-Kalender 2003. 19th ed. Vol I, K. G. Saur, Munich 2003, p. 1053
 Staff Awards list at the Institute of Geodesy and Photogrammetry (IGP), ETH Zurich
 ISPRS Awards 2008, Beijing, China
 "Three new PhDs in one week...", ISPRS Highlights, 2007
 ASPRS Headquarters News, 2008
 Strategic Partnerships, Research for Development, North-South Centre, ETH Zurich

External links 
 Institute of Historic Building Research and Conservation (IDB), ETH Zurich
 Projects at the Institute of Geodesy and Photogrammetry (IGP), ETH Zurich
 ISPRS - International Society of Photogrammetry and Remote Sensing
 ASPRS - American Society of Photogrammetry and Remote Sensing
 ISDE - International Society for Digital Earth
 Calibration and Validation of Earth Observation data
 World Heritage Convention UNESCO
 Institute of Geodesy and Photogrammetry (IGP)

German geodesists
Photogrammetrists
Scientists from Bavaria
1944 births
Living people
Technical University of Munich alumni
Academic staff of ETH Zurich
People from Bayreuth (district)